The Roggeveld Wind Power Station is an operational  wind power plant in South Africa. The power station, which began commercial operations in March 2022, was developed and is owned by Building Energy. The energy generated at this wind farm is sold to the South African national electricity utility company Eskom, under a 20-year power purchase agreement (PPA).

Location

The geographical coordinates of Roggeveld Wind Power Station are 32°57'05.0"S, 20°32'55.0"E (Latitude:-32.951389; Longitude:20.548611).

Overview
The concession for this wind farm was awarded to G7 Renewable Energies of South Africa in 2015, as part of the fourth round of the Renewable Energy Independent Power Producer Procurement Programme (REIPPPP), of the Republic of South Africa. G7 signed a 20-year power purchase agreement with Eskom. Building Energy, a subsidiary of Red Rocket, took over the concession, in or after 2018. The design called for the installation of 44 Nordex turbines, rated at 3.15MW and 3 turbines rated at 3MW, for a total installed capacity of 147MW.

Construction
The engineering, procurement and construction (EPC) contract was awarded to Nordex, a German manufacturer of electric wind turbines. Concor, a South African construction company was a sub-contractor on the civil works. Nordex was also awarded a 15-year service contract for the wind farm, by the owners.

Funding
Total construction costs for this wind farm are reported to amount to US$284 million. The list of funders for this energy infrastructure project includes:

 Development Bank of Southern Africa
 Rand Merchant Bank
 Old Mutual

See also

 List of power stations in South Africa
 Garob Wind Power Station
 Oyster Bay Wind Power Station
 Kangnas Wind Power Station

References

External links
 Official website

Wind farms in South Africa
Economy of the Western Cape
Energy infrastructure in Africa
2022 establishments in South Africa
Energy infrastructure completed in 2022
21st-century architecture in South Africa